The Korean term Gyongdang or Gyeongdang (敬堂 "royal hall") may refer to:
 a portion of the Pungnap earthen ramparts
   pen name of Jang Heung-hyo (1564-1633)
   Yeon-gyeong-dang, a building of Gyeongbok Palace, built in 1827/8. 
Gyeongdang 24ban Muye, in the "twenty-four methods" or disciplines of   Korean martial arts according to  the 1795  Muyedobotongji ("Comprehensive Illustrated Manual of Martial Arts").